The 2012 MTV Video Music Awards, hosted by Kevin Hart, took place on Thursday, September 6, 2012, honoring the best music videos from the previous year. The awards were broadcast from the Staples Center arena at L.A. Live in Downtown Los Angeles. Nominations were announced on July 31, 2012. Rihanna and Drake were the most nominated artists that year with five nominations apiece, followed by Katy Perry and Beyoncé, who received four.

One Direction was the biggest winner of the night winning their three nominations, including Best New Artist, and Rihanna went on to win Video of the Year. Both M.I.A. and Chris Brown won two awards each.

The awards ceremony, with an average of 6.1 million viewers, was the least-watched VMA show since 2007. The major factor which contributed to the drop in ratings was most likely altering the program's broadcast date to Thursday instead of Sunday, the day MTV had been using since 2004, with the exception of the 2006 ceremony. MTV also moved up the telecast to 8pm instead of 9pm, to avoid competing with President Barack Obama's speech at the 2012 Democratic National Convention. This was somewhat early for MTV's targeted audience. Best Special Effects renamed Best Visual Effects.

Performances

House artist
 Calvin Harris

Source:

Presenters

Pre-show
 Sway Calloway – presented Best Video with a Message
 James Montgomery – presented Best Electronic Dance Music Video
 Jim Cantiello and Ton Do-Nguyen – presented Most Share-Worthy Video
 Christina Garibaldi – Red Carpet

Main show
 Katy Perry – presented Best Pop Video
 Dwight Howard – chatted with host Kevin Hart and introduced the next set of presenters
 Miley Cyrus and Mac Miller – introduced P!nk
 Demi Lovato and Rita Ora – presented Best Male Video
 Zoe Saldana – introduced Frank Ocean
 Rashida Jones and Andy Samberg – presented Best Hip-Hop Video
 The Wanted and Rebel Wilson – presented Best Female Video
 Psy – appeared and danced to his "Gangnam Style" on stage with host Kevin Hart while he introduced the next presenters
 Ezra Miller and Emma Watson – introduced Green Day
 Peter Facinelli, Elizabeth Reaser, Bill Condon, Robert Pattinson, Taylor Lautner and Jackson Rathbone – introduced an exclusive Breaking Dawn: Part 2 sneak peek preview
 Kesha and Wiz Khalifa – presented Best New Artist
 The Fierce Five (Aly Raisman, Gabby Douglas, Jordyn Wieber, Kyla Ross and McKayla Maroney) – introduced Alicia Keys
 Kevin Hart – presented Video of the Year and introduced Taylor Swift

Winners and nominees
Nominees were announced on July 31, 2012.

Video of the Year
  Rihanna (featuring Calvin Harris) – "We Found Love"
 Drake (featuring Rihanna) – "Take Care"
 Gotye (featuring Kimbra) – "Somebody That I Used to Know"
 M.I.A. – "Bad Girls"
 Katy Perry – "Wide Awake"

Best Male Video
  Chris Brown – "Turn Up the Music" 
 Justin Bieber – "Boyfriend"
 Drake (featuring Rihanna) – "Take Care"
 Frank Ocean – "Swim Good"
 Usher – "Climax"

Best Female Video
  Nicki Minaj – "Starships"
 Beyoncé – "Love on Top"
 Selena Gomez & the Scene – "Love You Like a Love Song"
 Katy Perry – "Part of Me"
 Rihanna (featuring Calvin Harris) – "We Found Love"

Best New Artist
  One Direction – "What Makes You Beautiful"
 fun. (featuring Janelle Monáe) – "We Are Young"
 Carly Rae Jepsen – "Call Me Maybe"
 Frank Ocean – "Swim Good"
 The Wanted – "Glad You Came"

Best Pop Video
  One Direction – "What Makes You Beautiful"
 Justin Bieber – "Boyfriend"
 fun. (featuring Janelle Monáe) – "We Are Young"
 Maroon 5 (featuring Wiz Khalifa) – "Payphone"
 Rihanna (featuring Calvin Harris) – "We Found Love"

Best Rock Video
  Coldplay – "Paradise"
 The Black Keys – "Lonely Boy"
 Imagine Dragons – "It's Time"
 Linkin Park – "Burn It Down"
 Jack White – "Sixteen Saltines"

Best Hip-Hop Video
  Drake (featuring Lil Wayne) – "HYFR"
 Childish Gambino – "Heartbeat"
 Jay-Z and Kanye West – "Paris"
 Nicki Minaj (featuring 2 Chainz) – "Beez in the Trap"
 Kanye West (featuring Pusha T, Big Sean and 2 Chainz) – "Mercy"

Best Electronic Dance Music Video
  Calvin Harris – "Feel So Close"
 Avicii – "Levels"
 Duck Sauce – "Big Bad Wolf"
 Skrillex – "First of the Year (Equinox)"
 Martin Solveig – "The Night Out"

Best Direction
  M.I.A. – "Bad Girls" (Director: Romain Gavras)
 Coldplay (featuring Rihanna) – "Princess of China" (Director: Adria Petty and Alan Bibby)
 Duck Sauce – "Big Bad Wolf" (Director: Keith Schofield)
 Jay-Z and Kanye West (featuring Otis Redding) – "Otis" (Director: Spike Jonze)
 Frank Ocean – "Swim Good" (Director: Nabil Elderkin)

Best Choreography
  Chris Brown – "Turn Up the Music" (Choreographer: Anwar "Flii" Burton)
 Avicii – "Levels" (Choreographers: Richy Greenfield and Petro Papahadjopoulos)
 Beyoncé – "Countdown" (Choreographers: Danielle Polanco, Frank Gatson, Beyoncé and Anne Teresa De Keersmaeker)
 Jennifer Lopez (featuring Pitbull) – "Dance Again" (Choreographer: JR Taylor)
 Rihanna – "Where Have You Been" (Choreographer: Hi-Hat)

Best Visual Effects
  Skrillex – "First of the Year (Equinox)" (Visual Effects: Deka Brothers and Tony "Truand" Datis)
 David Guetta (featuring Nicki Minaj) – "Turn Me On" (Visual Effects: Alex Frisch, Joe Harkins, Scott Metzger and Vico Sharabani)
 Linkin Park – "Burn It Down" (Visual Effects: Ghost Town Media)
 Katy Perry – "Wide Awake" (Visual Effects: Ingenuity Engine)
 Rihanna – "Where Have You Been" (Visual Effects: BAKED FX)

Best Art Direction
  Katy Perry – "Wide Awake" (Art Director: Benji Bamps)
 Lana Del Rey – "Born to Die" (Art Directors: Anna Brun and Audrey Malecot)
 Drake (featuring Rihanna) – "Take Care" (Art Director: Jeff Higinbotham)
 Of Monsters and Men – "Little Talks" (Art Director: Mihai Wilson and Marcella Moser)
 Regina Spektor – "All the Rowboats" (Art Director: Anthony Henderson)

Best Editing
  Beyoncé – "Countdown" (Editors: Alexander Hammer and Jeremiah Shuff)
 ASAP Rocky – "Goldie" (Editor: Samantha Lecca)
 Gotye (featuring Kimbra) – "Somebody That I Used to Know" (Editor: Natasha Pincus)
 Jay-Z and Kanye West – "Paris" (Editors: Alexander Hammer, Peter Johnson and Derek Lee)
 Kanye West (featuring Pusha T, Big Sean and 2 Chainz) – "Mercy" (Editor: Eric Greenburg)

Best Cinematography
  M.I.A. – "Bad Girls" (Director of Photography: André Chemetoff)
 Adele – "Someone Like You" (Director of Photography: David Johnson)
 Coldplay (featuring Rihanna) – "Princess of China" (Director of Photography: Stéphane Vallée)
 Lana Del Rey – "Born to Die" (Director of Photography: André Chemetoff)
 Drake (featuring Rihanna) – "Take Care" (Director of Photography: Kasper Tuxen)

Best Video with a Message
  Demi Lovato – "Skyscraper"
 Kelly Clarkson – "Dark Side"
 Gym Class Heroes (featuring Ryan Tedder) – "The Fighter"
 K'naan (featuring Nelly Furtado) – "Is Anybody Out There?" 
 Lil Wayne – "How to Love"
 Rise Against – "Ballad of Hollis Brown"

Most Share-Worthy Video
  One Direction – "What Makes You Beautiful"
 Beyoncé – "Countdown"
 Justin Bieber – "Boyfriend"
 Gotye (featuring Kimbra) – "Somebody That I Used to Know"
 Carly Rae Jepsen – "Call Me Maybe"

Best Latino Artist
  Romeo Santos
 Juanes
 Jennifer Lopez
 Pitbull
 Wisin & Yandel

See also
 2012 MTV Europe Music Awards

References

External links
Official VMA site

2012
MTV Video Music Awards
MTV Video Music
MTV Video Music Awards
2012 in Los Angeles